Gavin Morris (born 24 October 1998) is a South African cricketer. He made his List A debut for KwaZulu-Natal in the 2016–17 CSA Provincial One-Day Challenge on 15 January 2017.

References

External links
 

1998 births
Living people
South African cricketers
KwaZulu-Natal cricketers
Cricketers from Durban